5000 or variation, may refer to:

In general
 A.D. 5000, the last year of the 5th millennium CE, an exceptional common year starting on Wednesday
 5000 BCE, a year in the 5th millennium BC
 5000s AD, a decade, century, millennium in the 6th millennium CE
 5000s BCE, a decade, century, millennium in the 6th millennium BC
 5000 (number)

Music
 Powerman 5000, an industrial hard rock band
 "5000", a 2002 song by Nelly from Nellyville
 Michael "5000" Watts, rap artist

Other uses
 5000 metres, an event raced by long-distance athletes
 United States $5000 bill featuring a portrait of James Madison
 Ford 5000, a tractor
 5000 IAU, an asteroid in the Asteroid Belt, the 5000th asteroid registered
 5000 (District of Berat), one of the postal codes in Albania

See also

 
5000 series (disambiguation)